Chemistry Education Research and Practice is a quarterly peer-reviewed open access academic journal published by the Royal Society of Chemistry covering chemistry education. The editor-in-chief is Keith S. Taber of the University of Cambridge. The Associate Editors are Ajda Kahveci of DePaul University, Scott E. Lewis of the University of South Florida, and Michael K. Seery of the University of Edinburgh. According to the Journal Citation Reports, the journal has a 2020 impact factor of 2.959.

The journal was originally published by the University of Ioannina, but switched to the Royal Society of Chemistry at the end of 2005 when it merged with University Chemistry Education. The society also publishes Education in Chemistry, a news magazine on the same topic.

Sponsorship by the RSC 
The journal is able to be open-access, yet not have page or process charges levied against authors, due to sponsorship from the Education Division of the RSC. The RSC is a charity, as well as a learned society, and support for an open-access educational journal is seen as furthering its educational mission.

Theme issues 
The journal includes an annual issue on a specific theme. Past theme issues are listed on the journal website.

References

External links 

 
 University Chemistry Education

Chemistry journals
Chemical education journals
Royal Society of Chemistry academic journals
Quarterly journals
Publications established in 2000
English-language journals
Open access journals